The Eastern Daily Press (EDP) is a regional newspaper covering Norfolk, northern parts of Suffolk and eastern Cambridgeshire, and is published daily in Norwich, UK.

Founded in 1870 as a broadsheet called the Eastern Counties Daily Press, it changed its name to the Eastern Daily Press in 1872. It switched to the compact (tabloid) format in the mid-1990s. The paper is now owned and published by Archant, formerly known as Eastern Counties Newspapers Group. It aims to represent the interests of the local population in the region in a non-partisan way, its mission statement being to "champion a fair deal for the future prosperity of the region". Despite its commitment to regional issues, the EDP also covers national (and international) news and sport.

The paper also produces a sister edition, the Norwich Evening News.

Notable editors
Edmund Rogers - founding editor, 1870–73

Current editors
 David Powles

References

External links 
 EDP24, the newspaper's online site.

Newspapers published in Norfolk
Mass media in Norwich
Newspapers published in Suffolk
Newspapers published in Cambridgeshire
Publications established in 1870
Archant
Daily newspapers published in the United Kingdom